Castle Park is a residential area of the town of Caerphilly, south Wales. As the name suggests, it is located near Caerphilly Castle.

Caerphilly